Armando Zambaldo (born 23 October 1943 in Illasi) is an Italian former racewalker

Biography
He competed in the 1976 Summer Olympics in 20 km walk and finished 6th.

Achievements

National titles
Armando Zambaldo has won 4 times the individual national championship.
4 wins in 20 km walk (1972, 1973, 1974, 1975)

References

External links
 

1943 births
Living people
Italian male racewalkers
Olympic athletes of Italy
Athletes (track and field) at the 1976 Summer Olympics
Mediterranean Games bronze medalists for Italy
Athletes (track and field) at the 1975 Mediterranean Games
Mediterranean Games medalists in athletics
20th-century Italian people